The Sikkim mountain vole (Neodon sikimensis) is a species of rodent in the family Cricetidae. It is found in Bhutan, India, Nepal and China.

Description
The dorsal fur is dark brown, the underparts are dark grey and there is an intermediate strip of ochre-brown where the two colours meet. The upper surface of both fore and hind feet are brownish-white and the tail is bicoloured, being brown above and white below. The Sikkim mountain vole is very similar in appearance to the Chinese scrub vole (Neodon irene) although the two can be distinguished by examination of their teeth.

Distribution and habitat
The Sikkim mountain vole is native to parts of southeastern Asia. Its typical habitat is Alpine meadows, rough herbage, forest edges and clearings.

Status
The Sikkim mountain vole has a wide range and is assumed to have a large total population. It is present in several protected areas including Langtang National Park and Khangchendzonga National Park. The population trend is unknown, but the vole is threatened by the disappearance of areas of suitable habitat, by the arrival of invasive species and by the predation of domestic dogs and cats. The International Union for Conservation of Nature has assessed its conservation status as being of "least concern".

References

Musser, G. G. and M. D. Carleton. 2005. Superfamily Muroidea. pp. 894–1531 in Mammal Species of the World a Taxonomic and Geographic Reference. D. E. Wilson and D. M. Reeder eds. Johns Hopkins University Press, Baltimore.

Neodon
Rodents of Asia
Fauna of the Himalayas
Mammals of Bhutan
Rodents of China
Rodents of India
Mammals of Nepal
Fauna of Tibet
Western Himalayan broadleaf forests
Mammals described in 1841
Taxonomy articles created by Polbot